Laura Novoa (born 8 January 1969) is an Argentine actress. She appeared in more than thirty films since 1988.

Awards

Nominations
 2013 Martín Fierro Awards
 Best actress of daily drama (for Dulce amor)

References

1969 births
Living people
People from Buenos Aires
Argentine people of Jewish descent
Argentine people of Spanish descent
Argentine actresses